This is a list of mayors of Medellín, Colombia.

Ordinary mayors of Villa de la Candelaria 
Until 1863, the administrator of Medellin was known as the Ordinary Mayor of Villa de la Candelaria de Medellín.

 José Zapata y Múnera
 Tomás Ibarra Gil
 Carlos de Molina y Toledo
 José Álvarez del Pino
 Lorenzo Zapata Gómez de Múnera
 Juan Bautista de Mesa
 Francisco de Saldarriaga
 José Zapata y Múnera
 Juan de Londoño and Trasmiera
 Peter of Acevedo
 Francisco Castaño Ponce
 Carlos de Cevallos
 Diego Molina and Beltrán
 Francisco Clemente de Mesa
 Pedro de Celada Hidalgo
 Antonio Velásquez de Obando
 Juan Gómez de Salazar
 Alfonso Cristóbal de Toro
 Diego de Castrillon Bernaldo de Quirós
 Clemente de Molina and Toledo
 Lorenzo Zapata and Gómez
 Juan Esteban Jaramillo
 Juan Vélez de Rivera
 Antonio de la Serna
 Diego de Molina and Toledo
 Sebastian Pérez Moreno
 Clemente de Molina and Toledo
 Juan de Montoya
 Diego de Molina and Beltrán
 Alonso Jaramillo de Andrade
 Pedro de Celada Hidalgo
 José de Saldarriaga
 Lorenzo Zapata Gómez
 Juan Tirado Cabello
 Juan Zapata Gómez
 Antonio de Yarza
 Pablo de Ossa Zapata
 José Vasco Alvarado
 Lorenzo Zapata Gómez
 Bartolomé Gómez
 Hair Pulling
 Manuel of Toro Zapata
 Pablo de Ossa Zapata
 Cristóbal Toro Zapata
 Pedro de Inoso
 José Álvarez del Pino
 Sebastian Pérez Moreno
 Manuel de Espinosa
 Alonso Jaramillo de Andrade
 Peter of Acevedo
 Francisco Cataño Ponce de León
 Diego de Toro and Zapata
 José de Saldarriaga
 José de Ossa Zapata
 Antonio Londoño
 Carlos Álvarez del Pino
 Matthew Álvarez del Pino
 Pedro Leonil de Estrada
 Captain Francisco Mesa Villamil
 Francisco Díaz de Mazo
 Juan Tirado Cabello
 Sgt. Diego Ibáñez
 Antonio Velasquez
 Pedro Jiménez Fajardo
 Diego de Molina and Beltrán
 Ignacio de Cárdenas
 Francisco de Villa
 Francisco Ángel Pérez de la Calle
 José de Salazar
 Captain Enrique Velásquez Obando
 Sebastian Pérez Moreno
 Juan Francisco Cano
 Matthew Álvarez del Pino
 Antonio Quintana
 Cristóbal de Toro Zapata
 Antonio Velásquez de Obando
 José Saldarriaga
 Antonio Londoño
 José de Estrada
 Captain Juan Fernández de la Torre
 Manuel of Toro Zapata
 Francisco Ángel Pérez de la Calle
 Francisco Miguel de Villa y Castañeda
 Ignacio Javier Gómez de Viana
 Sebastián de Saldarriaga
 Domingo Ibáñez Cataño
 Enrique Velásquez de Obando
 Agustín de Villa y Castañeda
 Carlos Álvarez del Pino
 Antonio Quintana
 José de Saldarriaga
 Matthew Álvarez del Pino
 Nicolás Jaramillo
 Captain Juan Fernández de la Torre
 Nicolás Tirado Zapata
 Francisco Javier Félix de Mesa
 Francisco Miguel Pérez de la Calle
 Fernando Barrientos
 Carlos Álvarez del Pino
 Jose Palacios
 Enrique Velásquez
 Nicolás Tirado
 Matthew Álvarez del Pino
 Pedro Ignacio Sánchez
 Ignacio de Saldarriaga
 Baltazar de Salazar y Caicedo
 Francisco Miguel Pérez de la Calle
 José Palacio de Estrada
 Juan de Ochoa
 Vicente de Uribe y Betancourt
 José de Saldarriaga
 Francisco Miguel de Villa
 Nicolás Jaramillo
 Juan José Lorena
 Ignacio Vélez
 José de Celis
 Miguel de Uribe
 Juan Antonio de la Madrid
 Matthew Álvarez del Pino
 Christopher Vélez
 Francisco Miguel de Villa y Castañeda
 Rafael de Ricaurte
 Javier de Mesa
 Silvestre Cadavid y García
 Francisco Ángel de la Calle
 Manuel de Uribe
 Pantaleón Callejas

Mayors of Medellín 
Beginning in 1863, the title of the administrator of Medellín was changed from the Ordinary Mayor of Villa de la Candelaria to simply the Mayor of Medellín.

See also 
 List of mayors of Bogotá

References 

Lists of mayors

Mayors, Medellin